Elizabeth E. Hood is a plant geneticist and the Lipscomb Distinguished Professor of Agriculture at Arkansas State University. In 2018 she was elected a fellow of the American Association for the Advancement of Science.

Education and career 

Elizabeth Hood was born in 1952. She attended the University of Oklahoma earning a BA in sociology in 1974. In her masters she switched to botany, studying the biochemistry of a cyanobacteria (Anabaena variabilis). After completing her masters she moved to Washington University in St. Louis where she studied the natural plant genetic engineering capabilities of Agrobacterium tumefaciens as a PhD student studying with Mary-Dell Chilton and Robert Fraley.

From 1988-1994 she was an assistant professor of biology at Utah State University. After that six year interval she worked in industry, first at Pioneer Hi-Bred and then at ProdiGene. In 2003 she was a program manager at the National Science Foundation. In 2004 she was hired at Arkansas State University. In 2008 she was appointed the Lipscomb Distinguished Professor of Agriculture.

Research 

During her time at Washington University in St. Louis Elizabeth Hood created the Agrobacterium strain EHA101 which is widely used in plant transformation. Her research at Arkansas State University focuses on using plants as factories to produce large quantities of enzymes and studying how plants construct cell walls. She is the Arkansas representative for the Genomes to Fields public-private consortium working to enable to accurate phenotypic prediction in corn/maize across the different environments found in thirty different US states.

References

External links 
 

1954 births
American biologists
Washington University in St. Louis alumni
Oklahoma State University alumni
University of Oklahoma alumni
Arkansas State University faculty
Living people